Sinhasan (Marathi: Throne) is 1979 Indian Marathi-language political drama film directed by Jabbar Patel and written by journalist Arun Sadhoo. The film is based on two novels - one of the same name and the other named Mumbai Dinank by writer and freelance journalist Arun Sadhu. The cast of the film included Nilu Phule, Arun Sarnaik, Shriram Lagoo, Mohan Agashe, Reema Lagoo, Nana Patekar, Usha Nadkarni, Datta Bhatt and Satish Dubhashi.

Plot 
The movie draws a parallel from the political turmoil of India.

The main character is a journalist named Digu Tipnis (Nilu Phule) who uncovers a network of telephone tapping, relations between trade unions and politicians, etc. The plot addresses Maharashtra's political corruption linked with Mumbai's entrepreneurial sector. 
The movie starts with an assembly session where Chief Minister (Arun Sarnaik) has to leave the heated discussion to attend an urgent call. The caller (claims to be a well-wisher and informer) informs CM that some the members from his own party are secretively planning to remove him from his chair. The phone call changes the political scenario in the state and many activities start taking place behind the curtains. CM obviously doubts the Finance Minister of the state (Shriram Lagoo) who has started gathering the support of MLAs for trying to pose himself as a better candidate for a Chief Ministerial Post. In this chaos, certain factors like Media (Nilu Phule – Digambar - A journalist), a Union Leader named D’casta who has decided to take head on with smugglers (see a young Nana Patekar – a small time criminal) gain high bargaining power. The struggle for the power reaches to the peak when CM deals with the issues like Hunger strike, worker’s strike, famine and deaths due to malnutrition. Digambar (who is already troubled in his personal life) observes all these negotiations, compromises and Horse-trading that are happening in the political arena. Union leader announces a conference where he is going to reveal some secrets, FM almost manages to gather the required numbers and CM tries to judge who is on which side. And as a last nail in the coffin, one of the confidants in Police informs CM that Police is about to arrested his (CM’s) brother-in law with the charges of smuggling.
The FM faction is about to start the celebrations and suddenly a news strikes that shocks each and everyone involved. What is that news? Is it really true? What impact would it have on the political scene? The future events are very fast and unimaginable.

The movie has lot of scenes in between including extra marital affairs of Digambars maid with others, her husband (Nana Patekar), also affair of the Finance minister Sriram Lagoo with his daughter in law (Reema Lagoo), once such scene is quiet enticing in the movie in which Digambar goes to a saloon for hair cut, and when the barber probes him about the future of Maharashtra CM, he bluntly tells him "who ever becomes the CM, how will that make any changes in your life as a common man?" In short this is a very touchy, emotional, dramatic as well as realistic movie. Specially the song "Usha kaal hota hota" is heart wrenching.
Towards the end, Digu Tipnis becomes insane after being frustrated with the corrupt political system. The movie outlines how the effect of selfish and voracious behaviour of white collars and politicians on the common man. During one session in vidhan sabha, Arun Sarnaik as the chief minister, whose mental and physical health is disturbed by an anonymous phone call warning him of a conspiracy to dislodge him. The vultures in Jivajirao’s party, including ministers played by Madhukar Toradmal and Shriram Lagoo, swoop down on him after a bout of stress-induced illness. They advise Jivajirao to “take it easy”, but he ignores the unsubtle hints and instead plays his own game of thrones, working the phone lines to pit one cabinet minister against the other.

Song 
The movie became quite famous for the song "Ushakkal hota hota". The song was based on poem written by poet Suresh Bhat. The song is fiery as well as heart touching. It showed the misery of common man in a corrupt social and political environment.

Cast
 Nilu Phule as Digu Tipnis
 Arun Sarnaik as Chief Minister Shinde
 Shriram Lagoo as Finance Minister Vishwasrao Dabhade
 Mohan Agashe as MLA Bhudhaji
 Reema Lagoo as Dabhade’s daughter-in-law
 Nana Patekar 
 Usha Nadkarni as Shanti
 Datta Bhat as MLA Manikrao
 Madhukar Toradmal as Daulatrav
 Shrikant Moghe
 Satish Dubhashi as Dicasta
 Jairam Hardikar as Panitkar
 Ravi Patwardhan

References

External links 

1970s Marathi-language films
Films with screenplays by Vijay Tendulkar
Films based on Indian novels
Films directed by Jabbar Patel